Higher Definition is the 5th album from the Christian hip hop group the Cross Movement, released on October 26, 2004.

Track listing
Civilian Affairs
Redefined
It's Time
Hey Y’all
Lord You Are (feat. Michelle Bonilla)
Hip-Hop-cracy
Card Shark
Questions
On In Here
Jerseys & Fitteds
Big Words
Epiphany
Check For Us
We
My Life Cypha (feat. Timothy Brindle, shai linne, & Redeemed Thought)

BONUS TRACKS: 
The Bridge
Life, Camera, Action

2004 albums
The Cross Movement albums
Cross Movement Records albums